Istrianis myricariella is a moth of the family Gelechiidae. It is found in Algeria, Tunisia, the Alps, Portugal, Spain and Greece.

The wingspan is about 11 mm.

The larvae feed on Myricaria germanica.

References

Moths described in 1870
Istrianis